Blennerhasset and Torpenhow ( and ) is a civil parish in the Allerdale district of Cumbria, England. According to the 2001 census it had a population of 437, reducing to 423 at the 2011 Census. It is located just outside the Lake District National Park. Baggrow railway station was immediately north of Blennerhasset.

St Michael's Church, Torpenhow has a Norman chancel arch with a remarkable carving of interlocking human figures, and a painted wooden ceiling.

Toponymy

Blennerhasset is of uncertain etymology, one possible source is that it comes from the Old Norse heysætr 'hay shieling', which has been added to a Brythonic place-name containing blaen, 'top'. The -er- part in the middle " is asserted by Ekwall on the supposition that the full first element corresponded to Welsh blaen-dre, 'hill farm' ". However sæt is also found in place names of Old English origin as a term for a settlement and may also be influenced by Old English sīde. 'Hay' is also found in Old English in both placenames and literary sources with a variety of different spellings and variations such as hēg, hīeg, hīg, hew, heġe and ġehæġ along with Middle English haye and heye. These words range in modern translation as being Hay, Hedge and referring to open plains, fields or farms.

Interpretations of Torpenhow have developed over time. In Place-Names of Cumberland (1950) Torpenhow was etymologized as "Tosti's howe" (with howe deriving from Old Norse haugr 'hill, mound'), against a tradition identifying the name as an example of tautology in place-names, first proposed by Denton (1688).
Denton interpreted tor, pen and how as three elements all with the base meaning "hill". 
Ekwall's Concise Oxford Dictionary of English Place-names (4th ed. 1960) accepted Denton's torr+pen+howe etymology (against the 1950s "Tosti" proposal), but notes that torr+penn is not tautological. He expresses the idea of "top or breast of the hill", to which howe was added in a (single) tautology. The most recent published etymology is the '"[r]ocky summit" to which was added "hill-spur"', the three elements of Torpenhow deriving from, Old English torr 'a rock, a rocky outcrop, a rocky peak', Primitive Welsh penn 'head, end, top, height, a hill', and Old English hōh 'a heel; a sharply projecting piece of ground'.

It is also possible that the name Torpenhow might simply be entirely Brittonic and composed of the elements tor ("heap of rocks") + pen ("a summit") and the plural suffix ou (Welsh torpenau).

Governance
Blennerhasset and Torpenhow is part of the Workington constituency of the UK parliament. The current Member of Parliament is Mark Jenkinson, a member of the Conservative Party. Prior to the 2019 general election, the Labour Party had won the seat in every general election since 1979; the Conservative Party had previously only been elected once in Workington since the Second World War: in the  1976 Workington by-election.

For local government purposes it is in the Boltons  ward of Allerdale Borough Council, which is represented by Malcolm Grainger (Conservative), and the Bothel and Wharrels ward of Cumbria County Council, which is represented by Joseph Bowness (Conservative).

Its parish council is Blennerhasset and Torpenhow Parish Council.

Blennerhasset Mill
Blennerhasset Mill (at ) is on the south bank of the River Ellen.

Roman fort
A Roman fort is situated on the old Roman Road between Old Carlisle  and Papcastle

See also

Listed buildings in Blennerhasset and Torpenhow
 Torpenhow Hill

References

External links
  Cumbria County History Trust: Blennerhasset and Kirkland (nb: provisional research only - see Talk page)
  Cumbria County History Trust: Torpenhow and Whitrigg (nb: provisional research only - see Talk page)

Civil parishes in Cumbria
Allerdale
Roman sites in Cumbria